Serjbel    is a small Lebanese Christian village in the Chouf District of the Mont Liban state in Lebanon.

References

External links
Short video of life in Serjbel

Populated places in Chouf District